= Kangde =

Kangde (Chinese: 康德) may refer to:

- The second era name of Manchukuo, used during 1934–1945.
- Puyi, the emperor who used this era name.
